Joseph Arthur Foden (10 March 1918 – 16 February 1995) was an Australian rules footballer who played with North Melbourne in the Victorian Football League (VFL).

Foden served in the Australian Army during World War II.

Notes

External links 

1918 births
1995 deaths
Australian rules footballers from Victoria (Australia)
North Melbourne Football Club players